Bishop Pankratius von Dinkel (9 February 1811 – 8 October 1894) was Bishop of Augsburg, Germany from 1858 until his death in 1894.

Born on 9 February 1811, Staffelstein; he was ordained and consecrated as a Parish Priest of Bamberg, Germany by Archbishop Gregor Leonhard Andreas von Scherr, O.S.B. on 31 August 1834 at the age of 23.

On 16 July 1858, aged 47, he was appointed as Bishop of Augsburg, and confirmed on 27 September. Pankratius was later ordained on 21 November 1858.

On 8 October 1894, he died, aged 83, in Augsburg.

He was a priest for 60 years and a bishop for almost 36 years.

External links
Catholic Hierarchy

1811 births
1894 deaths
People from Bad Staffelstein
Roman Catholic bishops of Augsburg